Ngāi Tūhoe, often known simply as Tūhoe, is a Māori iwi of New Zealand. It takes its name from an ancestral figure, Tūhoe-pōtiki. Tūhoe is a Māori-language word meaning "steep" or "high noon". Tūhoe people also bear the sobriquet Nga Tamariki o te Kohu ("the children of the mist"). Tūhoe traditional land is at Te Urewera (the former Te Urewera National Park) in the eastern North Island, a steep, heavily forested area which includes Lake Waikaremoana. Tūhoe traditionally relied on the forest for their needs. The tribe had its main centres of population in the small mountain valleys of Ahikereru and Ruatāhuna, with Maungapohatu, the inner sanctum of the Urewera, as their sacred mountain. The Tūhoe country had a great reputation among the neighbouring tribes as a graveyard for invading forces.

Tūhoe people have a reputation for their continued strong adherence to Māori identity and for their unbroken use of the Māori language, which 62% of them still speak (2018 figure). Of the Tūhoe people, estimated to number between 33,000 and 46,000About 30 per cent still live on their tribal lands; most of the rest live in towns on the fringes of Te Urewera and in the larger North Island cities. At least 5,000 live in Australia. Subtribes of Tūhoe include Ngāti Koura, Ngāti Rongo, Ngāti Tāwhaki, Tamakaimoana, Ngāti Whare, Te Whānau Pani, Ngāti Hinekura and Patuheuheu.

The Tūhoe continue to maintain camps in Te Urewera and help run conservation programmes for endangered birds, such as the North Island brown kiwi and the North Island kōkako. Many Tūhoe return to their homelands every two years for the Te Hui Ahurei ā Tūhoe (Tūhoe Festival), which features kapa haka, debates, sports competitions, and fashion shows. The event provides an important opportunity to maintain ties with friends and relatives.

History

19th century
Tūhoe had little direct contact with the early European settlers. The first major contact occurred when the iwi fought against the settler government in the battle of Ōrākau in 1864. Rewi Maniapoto, who had some tribal links to Tūhoe, visited the Urewera in 1862 and persuaded them to take part in the rebellion against the government; he went against the wishes of some of the elders. Initially reluctant, the Tūhoe gave Rewi ammunition to back the rebellion. During a cease-fire in the Battle of Orakau, under a flag of truce, Gilbert Mair, a translator, was shot in the shoulder by a Tūhoe warrior. Nearly all the Tūhoe at the battle were killed.

The following year authorities accused the Tūhoe of sheltering Kereopa Te Rau, a Hauhau wanted for killing and beheading Karl Volkner, a missionary of the Church Missionary Society, in what was called the Volkner Incident. Initially, the Tūhoe had cooperated in tracking down the Hauhau leader and had taken him prisoner. The Tūhoe tried to use him as a bargaining chip but the government demanded Te Rau be handed over for trial. After the Tūhoe released him, Te Rau hid in the Ureweras. As punishment, in 1866 the government confiscated 5700ha or about 7% of Tūhoe land on its northern coastal border. The confiscated Tūhoe land adjoined the land confiscated from Bay of Plenty rebels after the battle of Gate Pā. The Crown took the Tūhoe's only substantial flat, fertile land, which also provided their only access to the coast for kai moana (sea food). The Tūhoe people retained only interior, more difficult land, setting the scene for later famines.

In 1868, Tūhoe sheltered the Māori leader Te Kooti, a fugitive who had escaped from imprisonment on the Chatham Islands. Te Kooti arrived in the area with a large group of escaped convicts, fully armed with modern weapons he had stolen from the ship he had hijacked. It is doubtful that the Tūhoe could have resisted his demands for sanctuary. Some Tūhoe joined his armed Ringatū band, but other Tūhoe told government forces of Te Kooti's whereabouts. Some joined the armed forces to hunt him down. Government forces punished those Tūhoe who supported Te Kooti during the manhunt. Te Ara, the Online Encyclopedia of New Zealand, notes:

Old enemies of Tūhoe fought on the side of the government; they carried out most of the raids into Te Urewera during a prolonged and destructive search between 1869 and 1872. In a policy aimed at turning the tribe away from Te Kooti, a scorched earth campaign was unleashed against Tūhoe; people were imprisoned and killed, their cultivations and homes destroyed, and stock killed or runoff. Through starvation, deprivation and atrocities at the hands of the government’s Māori forces, Tūhoe submitted to the Crown.

Te Kooti himself escaped to the King Country, and after the events surrounding the hunt for him, Tūhoe isolated themselves, closing off access to their lands by refusing to sell, lease or survey them, and blocking the building of roads.

Twenty years later, Te Urewera leaders, Premier Seddon, and Native Affairs Minister Timi (James) Carroll negotiated the 1896 "Urewera District Native Reserve Act" (UDNR). It provided for Tūhoe self-government through a General Committee and local committees, with the Native Land Court excluded and titles determined instead by a commission comprising two Pākehā and five Tūhoe commissioners. In practice however, the Crown through a mixture of ineptitude and bad-faith "...totally failed to give effect to its promises in the UDNR Act; failed to act fairly, reasonably, and honourably...and failed to protect the Treaty rights of all the peoples of Te Urewera..."

1916 police raid

Historian James Belich describes the Urewera as one of the last zones of Māori autonomy, and the scene of the last case of armed Māori resistance: the 1916 New Zealand Police raid to arrest the Tūhoe prophet Rua Kenana.

On 2 April 1916 a 70-strong, and heavily armed, police party arrived at Maungapohatu to arrest him for sedition. Because Rua's village was so remote, the police had to take a lot of equipment and camped on the way. They moved like a small army with wagons and pack-horses, and included New Zealand Herald photographer Arthur Breckon. So as not to alert the Maungapohatu village of their intention to spring an attack they did not wear their police uniforms till just before the raid. They were convinced that when they reached Maungapohatu there would be an ambush.

There was no violent resistance from Rua personally, but his supporters fought a brisk half-hour gun battle with the police in which two Māori, including Rua's son Toko, were killed and two wounded. Four constables were also wounded. Rua was arrested and transported to Rotorua, his hair and beard removed. From Rotorua, with six other Māori prisoners including Whatu, Rua was transferred to Auckland and sent directly to Mount Eden prison. Rua was held, at first, on a nine months sentence imposed for the 1915 charges and now increased by his default of fines. After a trial on sedition which lasted 47 days, New Zealand's longest until 1977, he was found not guilty; but sentenced to one year's imprisonment for resisting the police.

Twentieth century
Significant European penetration did not occur in the Urewera district until the 20th century. A road was built by the government from Rotorua to Ruatāhuna in 1901 to end the isolation of Tūhoe by opening up the first motor road.

Tūhoe did eventually realise, especially in the Great Depression, that to develop their local economy they needed good roads to the outside world. They donated some land for road rights of way. As early as 1906, Tūhoe had given land for roads and offered free labour to assist in the construction, but building arterial roads in the Ureweras had a low government priority. In the early 1900s traces of gold were found in the Ureweras and Rua Te Kanana tried to sell illegal mining rights to raise money. At the same time Rua wished to sell very large areas of land to the government to raise funds for his new Jerusalem, but despite having a petition signed by every Tūhoe adult, the government insisted that he stick to the law.

In the 1920s Gordon Coates, Minister of Public Works, went to the area to check its suitability for a railway and to discuss roads. The land was very steep with the Poverty Bay Herald describing the gradient as "one in nothing". Coates knew that by this time, Tūhoe refused to make any contribution to the road at all. The mountainous terrain was daunting for farming. Tūhoe could not accumulate any capital to develop land they had cleared from 1907. Instead they sold all their sheep and cattle to pay for legal costs. These debts were not paid until 1931.

In the early 1930s the government helped develop Tūhoe land at both Ruatoki and Ruatāhuna. It understood that, like many New Zealanders in the Great Depression, Tūhoe had hard times. In 1934 a teacher wrote that "they have no money apart from what is given by government as Family Allowances and Old Age Pensions". A 1936 report noted that land development at Maungapohatu Mountain (a Ringatu stronghold) "would be a social success if undertaken". The report pointed out that the venture would probably fail if Tūhoe were required to pay back both the interest and the capital. In 1937, after several other studies, the government decided that it was uneconomic to invest in roads or settlements. By this time, the isolated Maungapohatu settlement had collapsed anyway.

Late 20th and early 21st century

The Tūhoe population was always small and living conditions were poor. School records from the 1920s and 1930s show very high death rates, especially of children. 75% of those who died were people under 25. The main causes of death were infectious diseases, such as influenza, gastroenteritis, typhoid fever and whooping cough. Between 1924 and 1936, the Depression period, 57 people died in a community of 30 families.

From the late 1990s, some Tūhoe started identifying as the "Tūhoe nation", and emphasising widespread Tūhoe rejection of what they call Pākehā rule. It has been argued that because no Tūhoe or Tūhoe representative ever signed the Treaty of Waitangi, they never gave up their sovereignty.

Tūhoe and other local iwi brought the Urewera claim to the Waitangi Tribunal in 2002, with submissions accepted up until 2005.

2007 police raid

There was a major armed-police raid in the Ureweras on 15 October 2007 amid claims that some Tūhoe had run terrorist training-camps there. Roadblocks were set up between Ruatoki and Taneatua by armed police, who searched and questioned everyone who passed through, including a school bus, and locals said they felt intimidated.

No terrorism charges were laid, and the Police Commissioner Howard Broad later publicly apologised for the actions of his officers during the raid, acknowledging they had set back relations between police and Tūhoe people: "We regret the hurt and stress caused to the community of Ruatoki and we will seek an appropriate way to repair the damage done to police-Maori relations. History tells us that episodes such as this can and do take decades to heal." A 2013 IPCA review found "...police searches, vehicle stops, roadblocks and photographs taken in Tuhoe country on October 15, 2007, unlawful, unjustified and unreasonable."

Waitangi settlement
A final settlement was signed in June 2013, after being ratified by all Tūhoe members. Under the deal, Tūhoe received financial, commercial and cultural redress valued at approximately $170 million; an historical account and Crown apology; and the co-governance of a new legal entity, Te Urewera. It was put into law by the passing of the "Tūhoe Claims Settlement Act 2014".

Hapū and marae

Ngāti Koura

Ngāti Koura is a hapu (subtribe) in the eastern Bay of Plenty in the North Island of New Zealand. Two marae are traditionally associated with Ngāti Koura: Otenuku and Te Papakainga. Otenuku marae is the site of Te Tapuwae, a cemetery in which many tribal chiefs of Tūhoe are buried.

References

External links
 Tūhoe iwi website
 Ngāi Tūhoe, Te Ara: The Encyclopedia of New Zealand
 Tuhoe and their history in Te Urewera National Park, radiolive.co.nz